Ferrography is a specialized type of oil analysis used to study particle wear on machine components through analysis of contaminants in lubricating oil. It can be used to predict and diagnose errors occurring on machinery. Ferrography is related to tribology, which is the study of friction between interacting surfaces. Since the advent of ferrography in the 1970s it has been used in many industrial settings as a form of preventative maintenance.

History 
Ferrography was pioneered in the 1970s by the late Vernon C. Westcott to help the United States military diagnose problems related to bearing failure before the issues became deadly. At the time, the best method of analysis could not detect small particles, so by the time the military found problems it was too late to find solutions.  The military reached out to Mr. Westcott to find a way to solve this problem and from that Mr. Westcott developed the first ferrograph. The ferrograph first saw major use by the United Kingdom to detect helicopter failure in the Falklands War.

Purpose & Uses 
Ferrography is a staple in failure prevention maintenance. Continuous monitoring of the lubricating oil allows a change from expensive and often unnecessary preplanned maintenance to the more cost-effective failure prevention. Ferrography is unique because it can deliver information about enclosed parts as lubricating oil circulates through these areas and is still accessible. Rinsing vital components with particle free lubricant and analyzing the output can offer a detailed report of machine wear without disassembling anything.

Since its initial application in the military, ferrography has been found to be helpful in
 ships
 coal mining
 diesel engines
 gas turbines in the aerospace industry
 agricultural industry
 naval aircraft

Further applications 
Applying the idea of ferrography in other fields, techniques have been found to analyze wear outside of lubricating oil and of particles that do not carry magnetic properties. These uses have been found in processing grease samples, gas emissions; and in examining wear on arthritic joints. In arthritic joints, residue from bone-on-bone contact can be found in fluid near the joint and analyzed using direct-reading ferrography which can give information regarding rate of decline in the joint. As of November 2016, minimal information is available regarding further uses of ferrography.

Types

Analytical ferrography 
Analytical ferrography works through magnetic separation of contaminant particles and a professional analysis of the particles. A sample of the machine's lubricating oil is taken and diluted, then run across a glass slide. This glass slide is then placed on a magnetic cylinder that attracts the contaminants. Non-magnetic contaminants remain distributed across the slide from the wash. These contaminants are then washed, to remove excess oil, heated to 600 °F for two minutes, and the slide is analyzed under a microscope. After analysis, the particles will be ranked according to size. Particles over 30 microns in size are considered "abnormal" and indicate severe wear.

Particles are divided into six categories, with an additional five subcategories under ferrous wear:
 copper
 white nonferrous: usually aluminum or chromium
 babbitt: particles containing tin and lead
 contaminants: do not change appearance after heating, usually dirt
 fibers: typically from filters
 ferrous wear: magnetic particles that are attracted to the magnetic cylinder
 high alloy: rarely found on ferrograms
 low alloy 
 cast iron
 dark metallic oxides: darkness indicates oxidation
 red oxides 
Being able to identify different particles can prove to be invaluable, because the prominence of certain particles can point to specific locations of wear. Furthermore, the presence of particles that do not make contact with the lubricating oil can uncover contamination. This kind of analysis required a trained professional and can be prohibitively expensive for smaller operations.

Direct-reading method 
Direct-reading ferrography is a more mathematical approach to ferrography. Essentially, the buildup on the glass slide is measured by shining a light across the slide. The blockage of the light by the buildup of particles is then used, over time, to calculate an average. An increase in blockage indicates higher amounts of machine wear. This method is less expensive, as expert analysis is not required, and can be automated. However, once an issue is identified, less information is available to diagnose the problem.

Limitations 
While ferrography is an effective tool for wear analysis, it does come with several limitations. Ferrography is a very expensive procedure because of the specialized and sophisticated instruments required. Ferrography stands out among oil analysis methods because of the magnetic element involved. This allows for a more detailed report that similar methods cannot produce. Additionally, for the qualitative approach that is analytical ferrography, experts are needed to make sense of the raw output. Furthermore, ferrography cannot solve problems, only bring attention to them. These issues then need to be dealt with on their own.

References 

Maintenance